Patricia Smyth (born June 26, 1957) is an American singer and songwriter. She first came into national attention with the rock band Scandal and went on to record and perform as a solo artist. Her distinctive voice and new wave image gained broad exposure through video recordings aired on cable music video channels such as MTV. Her debut solo album Never Enough was well received, and generated a pair of Top 100 hits. In the early 1990s she reached the top 10 with the hit single "Sometimes Love Just Ain't Enough," a duet with Don Henley of the Eagles. She performed and co-wrote with James Ingram the song "Look What Love Has Done" for the 1994 motion picture Junior. The work earned her a Grammy Award nomination for Best Song Written for Visual Media, as well as an Academy Award nomination for Best Original Song. Smyth married retired tennis player John McEnroe in 1997.

Musical career

With Scandal

After growing up in the Brooklyn neighborhood of Gerritsen Beach, Smyth joined Scandal as lead vocalist in 1981. The band released a  self-titled debut EP the next year. Featuring the song "Goodbye to You," it went on to become Columbia Records' biggest selling EP. In 1984, they put out their follow-up, Warrior. Buoyed by MTV airplay, the album peaked at No. 17 on the U.S. Billboard 200 chart, and the first song off the release, also titled "The Warrior," was a Top 10 hit. However, despite their success, internal strife within the band led to their break-up soon afterwards.

Solo career
Following the end of Scandal, Smyth was invited by her friend Eddie Van Halen to join the band Van Halen to replace David Lee Roth as lead singer. However, she declined the offer, because she was eight months pregnant and "It was just not the right time for me," she says now. "I was a New Yorker, I didn't want to live in L.A. ... and those guys were drunk and fighting all the time." She guest-appeared on the Hooters 1985 album Nervous Night on the song "Where Do the Children Go" as an accompanying vocalist.

Smyth released her first solo album, Never Enough, in 1987. It contained her version of the Tom Waits song "Downtown Train," which Rod Stewart would make a hit three years later, and the title track "Never Enough," which was co-written with members of the Hooters and based on a song of the same title that Hooters members Eric Bazilian and Rob Hyman had written for their earlier band, Baby Grand.  In 1988 she contributed the Diane Warren penned "I Run Right Back" to the Caddyshack II soundtrack.  She put out another solo effort in 1992, the eponymous Patty Smyth. Off of that effort, she secured a hit record via a duet with Don Henley of the Eagles, titled "Sometimes Love Just Ain't Enough." This peaked at No. 2 on the Billboard Hot 100, and was certified gold for sales of 500,000. The album, also certified gold, featured an additional US Top 40 hit with "No Mistakes" and also spawned the minor hit "I Should Be Laughing." Smyth had previously recorded with Henley as a backing singer on several songs on his albums Building the Perfect Beast and The End of the Innocence.

Smyth subsequently co-wrote the 1994 song "Look What Love Has Done," nominated for a Grammy and an Academy Award after its inclusion in the soundtrack to the feature film Junior. Further soundtrack commissions resulted in her writing and composing the theme tune, "Wish I Were You," to the 1998 feature film Armageddon. (Her husband, John McEnroe, claimed in his autobiography that she was inspired to write the song by his own attempt at a musical career; she was struck by his excitement at playing music, when her own feelings about the music industry were much more ambivalent.)

In 2015, to promote the release of her Christmas album called Come On December, she crowd-funded a campaign to support the Headstrong Project with all the money raised on the pre-orders of her album going to the non-profit. The album featured the single "Broken," and the music video for the single was released just before Veterans Day, and was filmed on the grounds of a Veterans of Foreign Wars chapter. The album was released on November 20, 2015.

Reunion with Scandal
In 2004, VH1 recruited Smyth and the surviving members of Scandal for a Bands Reunited episode, resulting in a small reunion tour of concerts on the East Coast of the United States in 2005. The next year, Columbia/Legacy released a new Scandal compilation CD as part of the We Are the '80s series. The compilation contained three unreleased tracks from the 1982 recording sessions ("Grow So Wise", "If You Love Me", "I'm Here Tonight") as well as "All My Life," previously available on the flip side of "Goodbye to You". In July 2008, Billboard reported the upcoming release of new music by the band (featuring original members Keith Mack and Benjy King). They debuted their first single as a band ("Hard for You to Love Me," also referred to as "Make It Hard") in over 24 years on January 17, 2009 in Ridgefield, Connecticut.

Personal life
Smyth was married to musician Richard Hell in 1985–86; they had a daughter, Ruby. She met tennis player John McEnroe in 1993; their daughter Anna was born in 1995, and the couple married in 1997. They have since had another daughter, Ava.

Smyth and McEnroe live in a duplex on the Upper West Side of Manhattan.

Discography

Albums

Singles

References

External links
 PattySmythandScandal.com (official website)
 
 
 

1957 births
Living people
American women singers
Singers from New York City
Scandal (American band) members
Women new wave singers
American women rock singers
Columbia Records artists
People from the Upper West Side
American people of Irish descent
21st-century American women